Cato Sundberg (born 25 March 1981) is a Norwegian musician (vocals and guitar) and songwriter, best known as the front man of pop group Donkeyboy. Sundberg founded the group in 2005 with, amongst others, his brother Kent. In 2009, the pair were nominated for a Spellemannprisen for their band's debut album, Caught in a Life, in the category of popular music composition. Along with Kent, they also founded and are operating a production/songwriting team and audiovisual project Rat City. That music group is very popular in Norway and in Poland.

References

English-language singers from Norway
Norwegian guitarists
Norwegian male guitarists
Norwegian songwriters
Musicians from Drammen
1981 births
Living people
21st-century Norwegian singers
21st-century Norwegian guitarists
21st-century Norwegian male singers